is a Japanese manga series written and illustrated by Hiromu Shinozuka. It was serialized in Shogakukan's shōjo manga magazine Ciao from May 2008 to November 2014, with its chapters collected in eleven tankōbon volumes. It is about a middle school girl who discovers a devil baby on her bed one day. The manga was adapted into a seventy-five episode anime television series by SynergySP which aired in Japan from October 2011 to February 2014.

Plot
Honoka Sawada is a lonely girl who is often picked on by others. One night, a strange baby named Mao appears before her, and she soon learns that this baby is none other than a baby devil.

Characters

Honoka is a 14-year-old girl in middle school who lost her parents at a young age and now lives with her aunt Rikako. She is a shy girl who lacks self-confidence and her classmates take advantage of her. The series begins with her wishing she wasn't so lonely and this wish is granted when she becomes Mao's substitute mother. As the series progresses she develops feelings for Shin.

The baby devil that is given to be raised by Honoka. His main costume is based on a dinosaur and it gives him the ability to breathe fire. Overall Mao is a happy child, but he scares easily and often bursts into tears over the smallest of things – though he is always quick to recover. As the story progresses he becomes aware of this and often tries to overcome his fears and flaws in an attempt to impress Honoka. His favourite food is pancakes.

Shin is a boy in his second year of high school and is Mao's substitute father. He was introduced to Honoka by Kyou and agreed to help Honoka raise Mao at his suggestion. It is revealed in Episode 28 that he has a fear of needles but overcomes this phobia to help the devil children get inoculated.

A baby devil who goes to the same nursery as Mao. Her main costume is based on a penguin and it gives her the ability to project icy blasts from her mouth. She has a short temper and will quickly resort to violence. Likes to eat food, especially meats and currys. Since Itsuki taught her some childish jokes based on aubergines she's had an obsession with them.

Natsuki is a girl in her second year of high school. She is Karin's substitute mother.

Itsuki is Natsuki's younger brother and is in the same year and school as Honoka. He is Karin's substitute father.

A baby devil who goes to the same nursery as Mao. His main costume consists of a pink wig with a small hat on it, and matching animal print shorts and this gives him the power to throw electricity. He is a well behaved child who usually acts mature for his age, although he can be quite mischievous at times. His favourite drink is Melon Soda. While learning to speak he spent a lot of time watching Manzai comedy with Shiori which is the reason he speaks with a Kansai dialect.

Shiori is a girl in her first year of middle school and is Rai's substitute mother. She is quite outspoken and to begin with didn't get on well with the other parents. At one point she considered abandoning Rai but after an intervention by Honoka she became more approachable.

The principal of the Chibi Devi Nursery. He is always seen wearing thick glasses and has a grey moustache, although it's unclear if these are false. He is an apparent expert on baby devils and has written an encyclopaedia on them which he gives a copy of to Honoka when Mao first starts at the nursery. The devil children love to practice their magic on him.

The teacher at the nursery. She often berates the Principal for being as silly as the children.

Pepe is an animal from the Devil World that came to be the nursery's pet. Mao gave him the name Pepe after the sound his tail makes as it beats the floor while he walks. He is able to understand the human language but only speaks in a series of squawks which are usually then translated by one of the human-language speaking characters present.

A baby devil from a neighbouring nursery that comes to visit. She is the same age as Mao, Karin and Rai.

A baby devil from a neighbouring nursery that comes to visit. He is Chiyo's younger brother.

A young ghost who haunts the toilet at Pepe's house in the Devil World. She starts off as a very aggressive character until Mao learns to get along with her and gradually becomes very fond of her - although she doesn't return his affection.

Kyou is a boy in his second year of high school and is in the same class as Shin. He is Honoka's childhood friend and was the person she always turned to before Mao arrived. He is an anime otaku and on multiple occasions leaves abruptly to watch anime.

Honoka's aunt and current guardian. Her work keeps her busy and is the reason she stays away from home for extended periods.

Media

Manga
Written and illustrated by Hiromu Shinozuka, Chibi Devi! was serialized in Shogakukan's shōjo manga magazine Ciao from May 1, 2008, to November 1, 2014. Shogakukan collected its chapters in eleven tankōbon volumes, released from October 30, 2008, to January 30, 2015.

The manga has been licensed in Germany by Egmont, and in France by Soleil.

Volume list

Anime
An anime television series based on the manga was announced in the October 2011 issue of Ciao. The series began airing on Japan's NHK Educational TV, NHK-E, as part of the Dai! Tensai Terebi-kun program block, airing from October 10, 2011 to February 17, 2014. Each episode is exactly 5 minutes long. It began airing in Korea on November 19, 2013 on Tooniverse as Baby Devil!.

A costume design competition was announced on May 28, 2012 during the Dai! Tensai Terebi-kun program on NHK-E, immediately after episode 23 aired. This announcement was repeated again right after episode 25 (originally broadcast June 18, 2012) and a notification was put on the anime's homepage. The winning designs were featured in episode 39 as part of a "Magic Testing Room" which was a room where the children could use the magic from costumes not made by their parents.

Episode list

Notes

References

External links
 Official homepage at Shogakukan 
 Official homepage for the anime at Shopro 
 Official homepage for the first Chibi Devi game at Alchemist 
 Official homepage for the second Chibi Devi game at Alchemist 
 

2008 manga
2011 anime television series debuts
Anime series based on manga
Comedy anime and manga
Fantasy anime and manga
Shogakukan manga
Shōjo manga
NHK original programming